Fenais da Luz is a civil parish in the municipality of Ponta Delgada on the island of São Miguel in the Portuguese archipelago of the Azores.

History
The origin of the place name was justified by Gaspar Frutuoso as originating from the abundance of natural fenal that grew in the fields; fenais is Portuguese word for fenal. Writing in the Saudades da Terra referred:
"...the place of Fenais, in the 'courtyard' of the city of Ponta Delgada, there said, with letter changed and corrupted, to there being much fenal".

Its parochial church, dedicated to Our Lady of Light (in 1756) was constructed over the ruins of an older episode. The church was identified by Queen D. Maria I in the celebration marking the defeat between forces of D. António, Prior of Crato and Philip II of Spain in 1582.

Geography
Fenais da Luz is located on the north coast of the island and includes, along with the principal settlement of Fenais, the localities of Aflitos and Farropo. Other localities are Amoreiras, Nossa Senhora da Luz, São Jerónimo, Vereda de Baixo and Vereda de Cima.

Architecture
 Church of Nossa Senhora das Luz
 Hermitage of Bom Jesus of Aflitos
 Hermitage of São Pedro

References

Notes

Sources
 

Parishes of Ponta Delgada